Penelo may refer to:

 Penelo, a character in Final Fantasy XII
 Penelo (village), a village on Maré Island, New Caledonia

See also
 Panelo